ART may refer to:

Organizations
 American Refrigerator Transit Company
 Arab Radio and Television Network
 ART Teenz

Performing arts
 American Repertory Theater, Cambridge, Massachusetts, US
 Artists Repertory Theatre, Portland, Oregon, US
 Avatar Repertory Theater, a troupe performing in the virtual world

Science and technology
 Adaptive resonance theory, a theory of brain information processing
 Acoustic resonance technology, an acoustic inspection technology
 Absolute reaction rate theory, of chemical reactions

Computing
 ART image file format, used mostly by America Online software
 Algebraic Reconstruction Technique, used in computed tomography scanning
 Android Runtime, a replacement for the Dalvik VM in Android

Medicine
 Anti-retroviral therapy, in the management of HIV/AIDS
 Assisted reproductive technology
 Androgen replacement therapy

Sports
 ART Grand Prix, a French motor racing team
 Aprilia Racing Technology or Aprilia Racing Team, by Aprilia, in MotoGP
 Asia Racing Team, Chinese motor racing team
 Athlete Refugee Team

Transportation
 Albuquerque Rapid Transit, a bus rapid transit line in Albuquerque, New Mexico, US
 Anaheim Resort Transportation, a mass transit provider in Orange County, California, US
 Arlington Transit, a bus service in Arlington County, Virginia, US
 Bombardier Advanced Rapid Transit, an automated guideway transit system
 Watertown International Airport (IATA airport code)
 Arrochar and Tarbet railway station (National Rail code), Scotland
 Autonomous Rail Rapid Transit, an autonomous rapid transit system from China

Other uses
 Argentina Time (ART), a time zone
 Artificial languages (ISO 639-2 code), certain unassigned constructed languages
 Aggression replacement training
 Alternative risk transfer, an insurance term

See also
Art (given name), the name
 Art (disambiguation)
 ARTS (disambiguation)
 Art line (disambiguation)